Solovyovo is the name of several rural localities in Russia:
Solovyovo, Puchezhsky District, Ivanovo Oblast, a village in Puchezhsky District of Ivanovo Oblast
Solovyovo, Verkhnelandekhovsky District, Ivanovo Oblast, a village in Verkhnelandekhovsky District of Ivanovo Oblast; 
Solovyovo, Kaliningrad Oblast, a settlement in Domnovsky Rural Okrug of Pravdinsky District in Kaliningrad Oblast
Solovyovo, Mezhevskoy District, Kostroma Oblast, a village in Georgiyevskoye Settlement of Mezhevskoy District in Kostroma Oblast; 
Solovyovo, Soligalichsky District, Kostroma Oblast, a village in Kuzeminskoye Settlement of Soligalichsky District in Kostroma Oblast; 
Solovyovo, Vokhomsky District, Kostroma Oblast, a village in Vorobyevitskoye Settlement of Vokhomsky District in Kostroma Oblast; 
Solovyovo, Priozersky District, Leningrad Oblast, a settlement in Gromovskoye Settlement Municipal Formation of Priozersky District in Leningrad Oblast; 
Solovyovo, Volkhovsky District, Leningrad Oblast, a village in Kiselninskoye Settlement Municipal Formation of Volkhovsky District in Leningrad Oblast; 
Solovyovo, Lipetsk Oblast, a selo in Solovyovsky Selsoviet of Stanovlyansky District in Lipetsk Oblast; 
Solovyovo, Mari El Republic, a village in Zashizhemsky Rural Okrug of Sernursky District in the Mari El Republic; 
Solovyovo, Bor, Nizhny Novgorod Oblast, a village in Kantaurovsky Selsoviet under the administrative jurisdiction of the city of oblast significance of Bor in Nizhny Novgorod Oblast; 
Solovyovo, Shakhunya, Nizhny Novgorod Oblast, a village in Khmelevitsky Selsoviet under the administrative jurisdiction of the city of oblast significance of Shakhunya in Nizhny Novgorod Oblast; 
Solovyovo, Knyagininsky District, Nizhny Novgorod Oblast, a village in Solovyovsky Selsoviet of Knyagininsky District in Nizhny Novgorod Oblast; 
Solovyovo, Vachsky District, Nizhny Novgorod Oblast, a village in Chulkovsky Selsoviet of Vachsky District in Nizhny Novgorod Oblast; 
Solovyovo, Volodarsky District, Nizhny Novgorod Oblast, a village in Ilyinsky Selsoviet of Volodarsky District in Nizhny Novgorod Oblast; 
Solovyovo, Soletsky District, Novgorod Oblast, a village in Vybitskoye Settlement of Soletsky District in Novgorod Oblast
Solovyovo, Volotovsky District, Novgorod Oblast, a village in Slavitinskoye Settlement of Volotovsky District in Novgorod Oblast
Solovyovo, Perm Krai, a village in Permsky District of Perm Krai
Solovyovo, Pskov Oblast, a village in Kunyinsky District of Pskov Oblast
Solovyovo, Samara Oblast, a settlement in Khvorostyansky District of Samara Oblast
Solovyovo, Smolensk Oblast, a village in Solovyovskoye Rural Settlement of Kardymovsky District in Smolensk Oblast
Solovyovo, Kimrsky District, Tver Oblast, a village in Goritskoye Rural Settlement of Kimrsky District in Tver Oblast
Solovyovo, Selizharovsky District, Tver Oblast, a village in Talitskoye Rural Settlement of Selizharovsky District in Tver Oblast
Solovyovo, Vologda Oblast, a village in Nizhneyerogodsky Selsoviet of Velikoustyugsky District in Vologda Oblast

See also
Solovyov